Fåberg or Faaberg may refer to:

Places
Fåberg, a former municipality in the old Oppland county, Norway
Fåberg (village), a village in Lillehammer Municipality in Innlandet county, Norway 
Fåberg Church, a church in Lillehammer Municipality in Innlandet county, Norway
Fåberg Station, a railway station in Lillehammer Municipality in Innlandet county, Norway

Other
Fåberg stone, a runestone near the Fåberg Church
Faaberg Fotball, a football club based in the village of Fåberg